Phormidium africanum is a species of cyanobacterium in the genus Phormidium.

References 

africanum